The Beach Reporter is a weekly newspaper serving the Beach Cities of Los Angeles's South Bay. It primarily focuses on the cities of Manhattan Beach, Hermosa Beach, Redondo Beach, and El Segundo. It is published every Thursday, with a circulation of approximately 55,000. It is considered a primary source of local news and events, as well as a guide to local real estate listings, covering some of the most expensive and active areas in California.

References

External links
The Beach Reporter

Newspapers published in Greater Los Angeles
MediaNews Group
Redondo Beach, California
Mass media in Los Angeles County, California
Weekly newspapers published in California